Mendam Berahi was a royal galley (ghali kenaikan raja) used by the Malacca Sultanate in the 16th century. The ship was under the control of Admiral Hang Tuah when he traveled to fourteen countries or cities. The ship was also used to establish relations with other countries, conduct trade, and transportation, which included bringing pilgrims to Mecca. A trip to Mecca lasted months and required a constant supply of food. However, Mendam Berahi could not transport food, water, and other necessities in large quantities, so the ship had to stop at ports to get supplies and shelter from poor weather. Records of the ship are only found in the Hikayat Hang Tuah, and other Malay accounts such as the Malay Annals do not record it. The Hikayat Hang Tuah was written after the 17th century, (more than 100 years after the event), so the information presented in it may be inaccurate. Portuguese accounts do not record Mendam Berahi either, although Tomé Pires' Suma Oriental contains references to a large ship, where he mentions a "flagship" of Malacca which carried many bombards. This ship, however, is not necessarily Mendam Berahi, and could be another ship.

Description 
Mendam Berahi was 60 gaz (180 ft or 54.9 m) long with a width of 6 depa (36 ft or 11 m). According to the study of Rohaidah Kamaruddin, the conversion of the units mentioned in the old Malay manuscripts will result in a length of 50.292 m and a width of 10.9728 m. According to Irawan Djoko Nugroho, the length is 50 m and the width is 12 m, while Pierre-Yves Manguin estimated it as 67 m long and 11 m wide, with the usual length-to-width ratio found on galleys of about 7:1. According to Md. Salleh Yaapar, the ship had three masts, 100 oars, and can carry 400 people, but this is only an estimate, it is not found in the existing Hang Tuah Hikayat manuscript. The ship was armed with 7 meriam (native cannon). The ship was made with a strong frame, and the walls were constructed with beautiful wainscotting, and covered by velvet cloth colored in yellow, red, and green. The roof (possibly referring to the roof of the rear cabin) was made of yellow and red glass, with several patterns depicting clouds and lightning. The ship was also decorated with a royal yellow cloth and was outfitted with a throne.

History 
In the Hikayat Hang Tuah, it is said that the ship was made for the purpose of the king of Malacca, to propose to the princess of Majapahit, named Raden Galuh Cendera Kirana, who was described as having a face as beautiful as a shining full moon and a body as pure as gold. Construction of this ship took 30–40 days. To speed up the work, the Bendahara (treasurer) of Malacca divided it into several groups: Hang Tuah worked on the bow, the shipbuilders were appointed to work on the ship's midsection, and the Bendahara worked on the ship's stern. The ornate pattern was designed by Hang Tuah, and for the space between the mainmast and mizzenmast designed by the Bendahara, from the bow to the mainmast was also designed by Hang Tuah, while Hang Jebat, Hang Lekir, Hang Lekiu, and all the royal singers and slaves do the carving. Hang Tuah was the one who proposed the name "Mendam Berahi" (Malay for Secret Desire) to be given to the ship.

After construction was completed, Mendam Berahi sailed to Majapahit to bring letters and gifts to the Betara (king) of Majapahit to convey the wishes of the king of Malacca. Mendam Berahi departure began with firing bedil as a salute. When they arrived in Majapahit, the fleet of Malaccan envoys signaled their arrival by firing bedil, which frightened the fishermen. Patih Karma Wijaya and Hang Tuah informed that there were seven Malaccan ships coming, and their intention is to propose to the daughter of the king of Majapahit. Several trials and tests were given to the Malay group to test their quality, and in the end Hang Tuah was given the title of admiral (Malay: Laksamana, Javanese: Penggawa Agung) by the Betara of Majapahit. After the business in Majapahit was over, Mendam Berahi sailed to Tuban for 7 days, and to Jayakarta for 3 days and 3 nights. Patih Karma Wijaya stayed in Jayakarta for 7 days waiting for the other ships. After all the ships were assembled they set sail and arrived in Palembang in a few days. Patih Karma Wijaya and Hang Tuah stopped waiting for the other ships. After all the ships have arrived, they set sail for Malacca.

Before the king of Malacca went to Java to marry the princess of Majapahit, he ordered the construction of one more ship. This ship was designed in the shape of the Kumbang Nuri because it was intended for the future queen of Malacca and her ladies-in-waiting and because the design could carry several cannons. The ship was named Kota Segara Kuning (or simply Kota Segara) by the king. The Malaccan royal entourage sailed to Majapahit, the king with Hang Tuah, Hang Jebat, Hang Kasturi, Hang Lekir, and Hang Lekiu boarded Kota Segara, while Patih Kerma Wijaya, Tun Bija Sura, and all the messengers and royal sign-bearers boarded Mendam Berahi. After the wedding was over, Mendam Berahi returned to Malacca with the Tuban-Jayakarta-Palembang route. Arriving in Palembang, the king of Malacca received news that Sang Jaya Nantaka had sent 30 perahu from Keling to convey his news to Malacca, but 20 of them were destroyed by the Portuguese.

After some time, Mendam Berahi was used by Admiral Hang Tuah to go to Inderapura to confirm whether Megat Terenggano, who was in Inderapura, was planning to attack Malacca. Mendam Berahi was also used by Hang Tuah, Hang Jebat, and Hang Kesturi to face Majapahit after two Majapahit envoys named Rangga and Barit Ketika came to question the king of Malacca about why he did not send an envoy to Majapahit. Hang Tuah replied that the reason Malacca did not send envoys to Majapahit was that Malacca would be attacked by Megat Terenggano and the king of Inderapura. After the affair in Majapahit was over, Hang Tuah used Mendam Berahi to go to the land of Keling to ask about the younger brother of the king of Malacca (Sang Jaya Nantaka) along with Tun Kesturi who knows the Keling language and has been awarded the name Maharaja Setia. Mendam Berahi was also used to attack the country of Inderapura.

In 1509, when the Portuguese first arrived in Malacca, admiral Hang Tuah was sick. Mendam Berahi was under the command of Maharaja Setia, and the ship managed to ram and sink 2 Portuguese jalilah (a type of ship). Seeing that they were outnumbered, the Malaccan fleet retreated to Malacca and asked Hang Tuah to come along. Hang Tuah finally agreed to join the battle. The two fleets met and attacked each other. In the end, Hang Tuah was shot and fell into the water, before finally being helped by the soldiers to climb into Mendam Berahi. The Malaccan fleet fled to Malacca with the Portuguese fleet in pursuit, but seeing their leader also injured and asking to be brought back to Portugal, the Portuguese fleet eventually withdrew.

With the threat of the Portuguese, the king of Malacca ordered Admiral Hang Tuah and Maharaja Setia to go to the country of Rum (the Ottoman Empire) to buy bedil (guns) and large meriam (cannons). Hang Tuah went on Mendam Berahi accompanied by many boats. After 5 days and 5 nights, he arrived in Aceh, staying there for about 12 days. After getting enough supplies, Hang Tuah sailed to Deva Island (Maldives), arriving there after about 10 days. After sailing for 2 months, Mendam Berahi arrived in Jeddah. Hang Tuah, Maharaja Setia, and their entourage anchored for a while, intending to go to the tomb of Eve. They reached it by walking for 2 days and 2 nights to Mecca and performed the pillars of Hajj. They also went to Medina to visit the graves of the Prophet Muhammad and his companions. After returning from the pilgrimage, the group sailed for 20 days to Egypt and stayed there for about 3 months to buy guns and load them onto the boats. Hikayat Hang Tuah also tells how the Malaccan boats and ships sailed for 17 days and arrived in Istanbul, but in reality, this route could not be passed because the Suez Canal did not exist at that time. Whatever the case, in Rum they managed to buy about 800 large and small guns, plus the 120 previously purchased in Egypt. The group arrived back in Malacca after about 4 months of sailing.

Replica project 
A replica of Mendam Berahi will be built in Klebang by a team of historians, and cost 10 million Malaysian ringgit. This project is expected to take 2 years to complete.

The University of Putra Malaysia Institute of Mathematical Research led this research and shipbuilding project based on a study of old manuscripts obtained from around the world that described the appearance of the ship. The information collected is then converted into modern language and the size is estimated. The project is estimated to be ready in 2023.

See also 

 La Réale, a French flagship galley.
 Real (galley), a Spanish flagship galley.
 Tarihi Kadırga, a galley used by Ottoman sultans

Notes

References

Bibliography 
  
 
 
 
 
 
 
 
 
 
 

16th-century ships
Indigenous boats
Human-powered watercraft
Three-masted ships
Sailing ships
Galleys